James "Merchant Prince" Ramsey (April 4, 1864  – December 23, 1939) was a provincial politician and business man from Alberta, Canada.

Early life
Ramsey was born in 1864 in Imlay City, Michigan. He was raised in Plattsville, Ontario. He began his career working as a merchandiser in his home town. He ended up traveling all over eastern North America eventually apprenticing under his father at his retail store in Guelph, Ontario. He moved west to Edmonton in 1910 and founded his own department store.

Business career
Ramsey founded and owned a popular department store in Edmonton titled James Ramsey Ltd. His store specialized in food, clothing, prescription drug and stationary. Ramsey remained in business until 1928 when he sold his store and merchandise to the T. Eaton Company. In 1929 Ramsey founded an investment company called Ramsey Hunt and Ramsey Limited. He retired a year later and moved to the Bahamas.

Political career
Ramsey began his political career on the municipal level. He ran for Alderman in the 1914 Edmonton municipal election. He served his two-year term in office before seeking election on the provincial level.

Ramsey was elected to the Legislative Assembly of Alberta in the 1917 Alberta general election. He won the electoral district of Edmonton East. He won the hotly contested election defeating three other candidates included future Edmonton Mayor Joseph Clarke.

Ramsay would become the leader of the Conservative Party after George Hoadley resigned and crossed the floor to the United Farmers of Alberta. Ramsey led the party for a year until 1921 when Albert Ewing took over as leader. He did not run in the 1921 Alberta general election and retired from provincial politics.

Ramsey returned to municipal politics with a bid to become mayor of Edmonton in the 1923 Edmonton municipal election. He was handily defeated by Kenny Blatchford. This was his last bid at politics.

Late life and legacy
Ramsey had two wives and fathered two daughters and a son. The Kelly and Ramsey building in downtown Edmonton is named in his honor. Ramsay died in his Bahamas home in December 1939 at the age of 75.

References

External links
Legislative Assembly of Alberta Members Listing
Edmonton Public Library Biography of James Ramsey

Leaders of the Progressive Conservative Association of Alberta
Progressive Conservative Association of Alberta MLAs
Edmonton city councillors
1864 births
1939 deaths
Canadian people of Scottish descent
Canadian emigrants to the Bahamas
American emigrants to Canada
People from Imlay City, Michigan